The Western Athletic Conference baseball tournament is the conference championship tournament in baseball for the Western Athletic Conference. The winner of the tournament receives the conference's automatic bid to the NCAA Division I baseball tournament.

Tournament
The Western Athletic Conference baseball tournament is an eight team double-elimination tournament held annually at various locations throughout the Western Athletic Conference region.  The winner receives an automatic bid to the NCAA Division I baseball tournament.  The other teams have to hope for an at-large bid.

History
From 1963-1981, the WAC baseball champion was determined by a best of three playoff between the division champions.

The WAC baseball tournament first started in 1982.  It began as a double elimination tournament involving the top two finishers in each division.  The conference kept this format through 1987.

In 1988, the conference discontinued divisional play and the top four finishers in the regular season advanced to the double elimination tournament.  This format lasted through 1992.

Divisional play again resumed in 1993.   The conference did not hold a tournament and instead opted for a best of three playoff between the two divisional winners to determine the champion.

In 1997 and 1998, the WAC began a six-team tournament that included the winners of each of three divisions, along with three at-large teams.

In 1999, the WAC once again eliminated divisional play. The top six finishers in the regular season advanced to the tournament. 

There was no tournament from 2000 until 2005.

In 2006, the WAC brought back a tournament and the top six finishers in the regular season advanced to the postseason.

In 2022 the WAC resumed divisional play and began an eight team tournament with the top four teams in each division advancing.

Champions

By year

By school

Italics indicate that the program is no longer a WAC member.

External links
Baseball @ WACSports.com
Fresno State Wins 2009 NAPA Auto Parts WAC Baseball Tournament
Hawai'i Claims 2010 WAC Baseball Tournament Championship
Fresno State Claims 2011 WAC Baseball Tournament Title

References